Paul Robertson may refer to:

Paul J. Robertson (born 1946), former Democratic member of the Indiana House of Representatives
Paul W. Robertson (1954–2014), Canadian businessperson, former president of Shaw Media
Paul Robertson (animator) (born 1979), Australian animator known for pixelised animation work
R. Paul Robertson, American endocrinologist